The 50th Regiment Indiana Infantry was an infantry regiment that served in the Union Army during the American Civil War.

Service
The 50th Indiana Infantry was organized at Seymour, Indiana and mustered in for a three-year enlistment on September 12, 1861.

The regiment was attached to 15th Brigade, 4th Division, Army of the Ohio, to June 1862. Unassigned Railroad Guard, Army of the Ohio, to September 1862. District of Louisville, Kentucky, Department of the Ohio, to November 1862. District of Jackson, Tennessee, XIII Corps, Department of the Tennessee, to December 1862. 2nd Brigade, District of Jackson, Tennessee, XVI Corps, to March 1863. 2nd Brigade, 3rd Division, XVI Corps, to August 1863. True's Brigade, Arkansas Expedition, to January 1864. Unassigned, 2nd Division, VII Corps, Department of Arkansas, to April 1864. 1st Brigade, 3rd Division, VII Corps, to May 1864. 1st Brigade, 1st Division, VII Corps, to February 1865. 2nd Brigade, 3rd Division, XIII Corps, Military Division of West Mississippi, to April 1865. 2nd Brigade, 2nd Division, XVI Corps, Military Division of West Mississippi, to May 1865.

The 50th Indiana Infantry ceased to exist on May 25, 1865, when it was consolidated with the 52nd Indiana Infantry.

Detailed service
October 25: Moved to New Albany, Indiana 

December 25: Bardstown, Kentucky  

February 1862: Advanced on Bowling Green, Kentucky 

February 10-March 3: Advanced on Nashville, Tennessee

until September 1862: Guard duty along Nashville & Chattanooga Railroad  

July 4–28: Operations against Morgan 

August 20:  Near Edgefield Junction (detachment)

August 20:  Pilot Knob 

September 14–17:  Siege of Munfordville, Kentucky (Companies A, B, D, F, and H) 

September 17:  Captured 

until November:  Paroled and sent to Indianapolis, Indiana (and duty there)  

November 1–10:  Moved to Jackson, Tennessee

December 18, 1862 to January 3, 1863:  Operations against Forrest in western Tennessee  

December 29–30:  Huntington 

December 30:  Parker's Cross Roads, near Jackson 

December 30:  Clarksburg (detachment). 

December 31:  Red Mound (or Parker's) Cross Roads 

until August 1863:  Duty at Jackson, Collierville and Memphis, Tennessee 

August 28:  Moved to Helena, Arkansas 

September 1–10:  Steele's Expedition to Little Rock  

September 10:  Bayou Fourche and capture of Little Rock  

until March 1864:  Garrison duty at Lewisburg, Arkansas 

March 2, 1864:  Reenlisted  

March 23-May 3:  Steele's Expedition to Camden  

April 2:  Antoine and Terre Noir Creek  

April 9–12:  Prairie D'Ann  

April 15:  Camden 

April 15–16:  Liberty Post Office 

April 16–18:  Camden  

April 17:  Red Mound 

April 30:  Jenkins' Ferry, Saline River 

until July:  Duty at Little Rock

until December: non-veterans duty at Little Rock 

July–August:  Veterans absent on furlough 

until January 1865:  Duty at Little Rock  

January 22-February 4:  Carr's Expedition to Saline River  

February 1865:  Moved to Mobile Point, Alabama 

March 17-April 12:  Campaign against Mobile and its defenses . 

March:  Siege of Spanish Fort and Fort Blakely 

April 9:  Assault and capture of Fort Blakely  

April 12:  Capture of Mobile 

April 13:  Whistler's Station  

April 13-22:  March to Montgomery

Casualties
The regiment lost a total of 218 men during service; 3 officers and 54 enlisted men killed or mortally wounded, 3 officers and 158 enlisted men died of disease.

Commanders
 Colonel Cyrus L. Dunham cashiered in 1863
 Colonel Samuel T. Wells - commanded during the Mobile Campaign

See also

 List of Indiana Civil War regiments
 Indiana in the Civil War

References
 Dyer, Frederick H. A Compendium of the War of the Rebellion (Des Moines, IA: Dyer Pub. Co.), 1908.
Attribution
 

Military units and formations established in 1861
Military units and formations disestablished in 1865
Units and formations of the Union Army from Indiana